Shinkyō can refer to:

Japanese new religions or Shinshūkyō (新宗教), the New Religions of Japan
Changchun, Japanese name Shinkyō (新京), the capital of former puppet-state Manchukuo
A sacred mirror, e.g. Yata no Kagami
Shinkyō (神橋), the Sacred Bridge, part of the Futarasan Shrine in Nikkō, Japan